Scott Alexander Millan (born 1954) is an American sound re-recording mixer, a member of the board of governors of the Academy of Motion Picture Arts and Sciences, and Sound Director for Technicolor at Paramount Studios. He is known for his collaborations with Sam Mendes, Tate Taylor, Oliver Stone, Frank Marshall, as well as his early work with Judd Apatow and the Farrelly brothers. Millan has won four Academy Awards for his work in sound for motion picture.

In February 2012, Millan was honored with the Cinema Audio Society Career Achievement Award.

Personal life 
Millan was born in Los Angeles, California and attended Ulysses S. Grant High School in the Valley Glen neighborhood of Los Angeles. His father Art Millan and mother Lynn were both television and film actors in the 1950s. He married Deborah and had two children; the former The Young and the Restless actress Ashley Nicole Millan and Brandon Millan.

Awards and nominations

Academy Awards
The Academy Awards are a set of awards given annually for excellence of cinematic achievements. The awards, organized by the Academy of Motion Picture Arts and Sciences, were first held in 1929 at the Hollywood Roosevelt Hotel. Millan has received four award from nine nominations.

BAFTA Film Awards
The BAFTA Award is an annual award show presented by the British Academy of Film and Television Arts. The awards were founded in 1947 as The British Film Academy, by David Lean, Alexander Korda, Carol Reed, Charles Laughton, Roger Manvell and others. Millan has received four awards from five nominations.

Primetime Emmy Awards

Daytime Emmy Awards

Cinema Audio Society Awards

Satellite Awards

References

External links
 
 CAS Awards 2012: CAS Career Achievement Award - Scott Millan

 Interviews
 Kaufman, Debra. "Sounds Like Team Spirit: When Mixers Match." Editors Guild Magazine May–June 2010 : Volume 31, Number 3.
 Kenny, Tom. "'Salt' Sound." Mix Magazine, July 27, 2010.
 Damski, Peter. "An Interview with Scott Millan." CAS Quarterly, Winter 2012.
 Altman, Randi. "Hitting the road for Skyfall." Post Magazine, November 2012.

1954 births
Living people
American audio engineers
Best Sound Mixing Academy Award winners
Best Sound BAFTA Award winners
CAS Career Achievement Award honorees
Emmy Award winners
People from Los Angeles
Grant High School (Los Angeles) alumni